Dream of Ding Village (') is a 2006 novel by the Chinese writer Yan Lianke. The 2011 English translation by Cindy Carter, published in the UK by Grove Press, was shortlisted for the Independent Foreign Fiction Prize.

It is a story based on the blood sales in rural Henan province that sparked a major AIDS crisis in China. After the first edition sold out, it was banned—no more copies can be printed in China. Yan Lianke has stated in interviews that the book could have been better if he had not been self-censoring himself to ensure it could be published. This ban is said to have been lifted in 2011.

In 2011,  a film adaptation of this novel named Love for Life was released in China, which is directed by Gu Changwei and stars Zhang Ziyi and Aaron Kwok.

Characters 

 Ding Qiang - young 12 year old boy. Qiang was poisoned and died in the very beginning of the novel. The entire story is narrated through his point of view.
 Father (Ding Hui) - blood kingpin of Ding village. One of the few characters who did not contract HIV. Ding Hui becomes very successful, eventually assumes the position of Chairman of the County Task Force.
 Uncle (Ding Liang) - Ding Hui's brother. 
 Grandpa (Ding Shuiyang) - Teacher and custodian at the local school.
 Tingting - Uncle's wife and eventual ex-wife.
 Lingling - wife of Ding Xiaoming (Uncle's cousin). Later Lingling divorces her husband and marries Ding Liang.
 Zhao Xiuqin - main cook at the school.
 Ding Yuejin and Jia Genzhu - residents who eventually take over the school and the official village seal.
 Ma Xianglin - musician who performs for the village while they wait for the supposedly new HIV medication.
 Li Sanren (ex-mayor).
 Sister (Yinzi) - eventually moves out of Ding Village with her mother.

Reception
Kirkus Reviews stated that it was "A sorrowful but captivating novel about the price of progress in modern China."

Translation

See also
 2006 in literature
 Chinese literature
 Plasma Economy

References

2006 Chinese novels
Book censorship in China
Novels about HIV/AIDS
HIV/AIDS in China
Novels by Yan Lianke
Novels set in Henan